Boruiyeh (also Romanized as Borūīyeh; also known as Būrrū’īyeh) is a village in Fathabad Rural District, in the Central District of Khatam County, Yazd Province, Iran. At the 2006 census, its population was 72, in 16 families.

References 

Populated places in Khatam County